Transport for NSW, sometimes abbreviated to TfNSW, and pronounced as Transport for New South Wales, is an agency of the New South Wales Government established on 1 November 2011, and is the leading transport and roads agency in New South Wales, Australia. The agency is a different entity to the New South Wales Department of Transport, a department of the New South Wales Government and the ultimate parent entity of Transport for NSW.

The agency's function since its creation is to build transport infrastructure and manage transport services in New South Wales. Since absorbing Roads & Maritime Services (RMS) in December 2019, the agency is also responsible for building and maintaining road infrastructure, managing the day-to-day compliance and safety for roads and waterways, and vehicle and driving license registrations.

The authority reports to the New South Wales Minister for Transport, Minister for Metropolitan Roads, Minister for Regional Transport and Roads, Minister for Infrastructure, Minister for Cities and Minister for Active Transport. Ultimately the ministers are responsible to the Parliament of New South Wales.

History

Predecessor transport departments

Ministry of Transport (1932–1990)

In March 1932, the first Department of Transport in New South Wales was formed by the Lang Government. Following the dismissal of the Lang government and the appointment of the Stevens Government in May, in December 1932, the department was replaced by the Ministry of Transport, which was divided into three departments:
Department of Railways (until October 1972)
Department of Main Roads (until January 1989) – spun out from Ministry of Transport in March 1956
Department of Road Transport and Tramways (until June 1952)

In June 1952, the Department of Road Transport and Tramways was further split into:
Department of Transport and Highways, soon renamed the Department of Motor Transport (June 1952 – January 1989)
Department of Government Tram and Omnibus Services, soon renamed Department of Government Transport (June 1952 – October 1972)

In October 1972, the Department of Government Transport and Department of Railways were abolished and were replaced by the Public Transport Commission, which continued to be part of the Ministry of Transport. The Ministry of Transport was later briefly known as Ministry of Transport and Highway between January 1975 and October 1978. In January 1989, the Department of Main Roads, Department of Motor Transport, and Traffic Authority of New South Wales merged to form Roads and Traffic Authority of New South Wales (RTA).

Subsequent departments (1990–2011)
In January 1990, the Ministry of Transport was abolished and replaced by a new Department of Transport and its successors:
Department of Transport (January 1990 – April 2003) – briefly branded as Transport NSW between 2001 and April 2003
Transport Co-Ordination Authority (April 2003 – July 2003) – interim
Ministry of Transport (July 2003 – July 2009)
Department of Transport and Infrastructure (July 2009 – July 2010) – branded as NSW Transport and Infrastructure (NSWTI)
Transport NSW (July 2010 – April 2011)

Creation of Transport for NSW
After winning the 2011 state election, the new Liberal-Nationals government under Barry O'Farrell renamed the transport department from Transport NSW back to Department of Transport. Later that year, in November 2011, the Transport for NSW was formed as a government agency and subsumed the Transport Construction Authority and the Country Rail Infrastructure Authority, and took over the planning and coordination functions of RailCorp, the State Transit Authority and Roads & Maritime Services from the Department of Transport. It also absorbed the functions, assets and/or liabilities of Sydney Metro Authority, Public Transport Ticketing Corporation as well as some functions from the NSW Department of Planning & Infrastructure.

The entities that were under Transport for NSW upon its creation, as underlined in the Transport Legislation Amendment Act 2011, were:
 Roads and Maritime Services
 Sydney Ferries
 State Transit Authority
 Rail Corporation of New South Wales (RailCorp)

The Department of Transport continues to exist as a government department and the ultimate parent entity of Transport for NSW and its entities or divisions.

Sydney Ferries

Transport for NSW contracted the Sydney ferry services to Harbour City Ferries in 2011, who started operations in 2012 and then Transdev Sydney Ferries in 2019. Transport for NSW continues to own the ferry fleet and the Balmain shipyard through its entity "Sydney Ferries". This entity is not to be confused with the branding of ferries in Sydney, which also uses the brand "Sydney Ferries".

Purchase of Sydney Light Rail and Sydney Monorail

Transport for NSW established the "MTS Holding Company" on 12 March 2012, and through the holding company, purchased Metro Transport Sydney, the owner of the Sydney Light Rail and the Sydney Monorail, on 23 March 2012 for $19.8 million. The company, light rail and the monorail also became under control of Transport for NSW and the government. The Sydney Monorail was closed down on 1 July 2013, and on the same day, the Metro Light Rail brand was phased out as part of a broader rebranding and reorganisation of public transport services in New South Wales. The light rail also became under direct ownership of Transport for NSW. The process of shutting down Metro Transport Sydney and transferring assets to Transport for NSW was completed in September 2014 with the deregistration of MTS Holding Company.

New railway agencies
Operation and maintenance functions of RailCorp were passed on to two newly-formed government agencies, Sydney Trains and NSW Trains in July 2013, initially as subsidiaries of RailCorp. However, Sydney Trains and NSW Trains are not controlled entities of RailCorp, but are instead controlled by Transport for NSW. The suburban services of CityRail (also a part of RailCorp) were transferred to Sydney Trains, while CountryLink (also a part of RailCorp) and the intercity services of CityRail were passed on to NSW Trains, trading as NSW TrainLink. As a result, CityRail and CountryLink were abolished.

In July 2017, Sydney Trains and NSW Trains became independent and standalone agencies under Transport for NSW, and ceased to be subsidiaries of RailCorp. At the same time, the Residual Transport Corporation (RTC) was formed. RailCorp continued to exist as the railway asset owner until 1 July 2020, when it was converted into a state-owned corporation and renamed Transport Asset Holding Entity (TAHE). The RTC will then own assets that are not suitable for TAHE ownership.

In July 2018, the Sydney Metro Delivery Office, which was formed in 2011, was converted into a standalone Sydney Metro operating agency under Transport for NSW, similar to Sydney Trains and NSW Trains.

Amalgamation of Transport and Road agencies
After the 2019 state election, the government announced they would be merging Roads & Maritime Services (RMS) into Transport for NSW, to integrate roads and transport into a single agency. Legislation to dissolve RMS and transfer its functions to Transport for NSW was passed in the NSW Parliament and granted royal assent in November 2019. RMS was dissolved and merged into Transport for NSW on 1 December 2019.

Parklands
On 1 April 2022, the Greater Sydney Parklands Trust was transferred from the Department of Planning and Environment (DPE) to Transport for NSW. The trust comprised Centennial Parklands (including Moore Park and Queens Park), Western Sydney Parklands, Parramatta Park, Callan Park and Fernhill Estate, and their individual park trusts. The Luna Park Reserve Trust, Place Management NSW and the Royal Botanic Gardens and Domain Trust and Smart Places Strategy were also transferred from DPE to Transport for NSW.

Purpose 
The authority develops regulations, policies and legislation to ensure that transport is delivered to a high standard, meets community needs, protects assets and public money, minimises environmental impact, and ensures the community is safe. The authority manages an annual multibillion-dollar transport budget and in partnership with the transport operating agencies manages more than A$106 billion in property, plant and equipment assets. Funding is provided for rail, bus, ferry, light rail, roads and community transport services and related infrastructure. The authority also funds concession schemes such as the School Student Transport Scheme, the Private Vehicle Conveyance Scheme and the Taxi Transport Subsidy Scheme.

Organisational structure

The authority was initially created as an integrated transport authority with six divisions, each headed by a deputy director general:
 Customer experience – to ensure journeys are as simple and seamless as possible;
 Planning and programs – to consolidate planning for all modes and develop a comprehensive transport masterplan;
 Transport services – to ensure transport services cost-effectively meet the current and future needs of customers;
 Transport projects – to manage major projects;
 Freight and regional development – to coordinate freight services and facilities, with particular focus on regional NSW; and
 Policy and regulation – to develop and oversight policies and laws pertaining to transport across the state

, Transport for NSW is structured as follows:
Operational divisions
Greater Sydney
Regional
Infrastructure and Place
Safety Environment and Regulation
Customer Strategy and Technology
Support divisions
Office of the Secretary
Corporate Services
People and Culture
Project delivery offices
Sydney Light Rail 
Parramatta Light Rail
Newcastle Light Rail

Entities
The NSW Department of Transport comprises the following entities:

 Transport Service of New South Wales
 Transport for NSW and its divisions and entities

Transport Service of NSW is an agency created in November 2011, in charge of employing staff for Transport for NSW, which cannot directly employ staff, to undertake its functions. The Transport Service also directly employs staff for State Transit Authority (STA), as well as senior executives of Sydney Trains and NSW Trains.

, the entities of Transport for NSW, as detailed in Transport Administration Act 1988, are:
 Sydney Ferries
 State Transit Authority (STA)
 Sydney Trains
 NSW Trains
  Residual Transport Corporation (RTC) – created in July 2017
 Sydney Metro authority – created in July 2018

Out of these, STA, Sydney Trains, Sydney Metro authority, and NSW Trains are government transport agencies.

Departmental leadership 
The following individuals have served as Secretary of Transport for NSW, or any precedent titles:

The Secretary of Transport for NSW is responsible to the Ministers (below).

Ministers
The following ministers are responsible for administering the Transport cluster:
 Minister for Transport, currently The Honourable David Elliott 
 Minister for Metropolitan Roads, currently The Hon. Natalie Ward 
 Minister for Regional Transport and Roads, currently The Hon. Sam Farraway 
 Minister for Infrastructure, Minister for Cities, Minister for Active Transport, currently The Hon. Rob Stokes .

Ultimately, the Ministers are responsible to the Parliament of New South Wales.

Public transport services

Transport for NSW directly manages most train, bus, ferry and light rail services in New South Wales. The authority manages the route design, timetabling and branding of these services and also provides passenger information via printed material, a telephone service and a website. Operation of the services is contracted out to a mixture of other government-owned organisations and private enterprise.

Transport for NSW public transport services are simply branded Transport. The following sub-brands are used depending on the type of service:
 Sydney Metro – rapid transit services in Sydney, with trains every 4–10 minutes
 Sydney Trains – suburban train services in Sydney
 NSW TrainLink – medium and long distance train and coach services throughout the state and extending interstate into Australian Capital Territory, Victoria, South Australia and Queensland
 Buses – bus services in Greater Sydney, Blue Mountains, Central Coast and Wollongong
 Sydney Ferries – ferry services in Sydney
 Sydney Light Rail – light rail services in Sydney
 Newcastle Transport – bus, ferry and light rail services in Newcastle

Passengers made 765 million public transport journeys in the 2017-18 financial year. Patronage on the Sydney rail network increased during this period–customer patronage grew by 10.5 per cent, while intercity patronage grew by 11 per cent.

Transport Info 
Transport for NSW provides a trip planner and transport service information on its customer service website, transportnsw.info, and via its 24-hour information line, 131500. These services, outsourced to Serco since July 2010, were previously known as the Transport InfoLine or simply 131500. A parallel Teletype service for hearing and speech impaired passengers is available on 1800 637 500.

Infrastructure

Public transport projects

Current

Completed

Roads
Some of the following key road building projects were inherited from Roads & Maritime Services in December 2019.

Current

Completed

References

External links
 Transport for NSW (main website)
 Roads and Waterways – Transport for NSW
 transportnsw.info (public transport website)

Government agencies established in 2011
Transport
Government departments of New South Wales
Intermodal transport authorities in Australia
Transport in New South Wales
2011 establishments in Australia
State departments of transport of Australia